Museum Mouth is a band that originated in Southport, North Carolina in 2009. It consists of three members: Karl Kuehn who also played in the band Family Bike (drums, vocals), Kory Urban (bass), and Morgan Roberts (guitar). Originally, Savannah Levin played bass and provided vocals but left the band in September 2010. Their band name is a reference to a line in the song "Little League" by Cap'n Jazz. Their musical genres include pop punk and rock. Museum Mouth is one of the more famous and long lasting bands to come out of the Wilmington DIY scene. Most of their music is downloadable for free from Bandcamp.

"Tears In My Beer", "Sexy But Not Happy", and "Alex I Am Nothing" received four-star reviews from Punknews.org.

Discography 
Full-Lengths
Tears In My Beer (3/10/2010)
Sexy But Not Happy (1/23/2012)
Alex I Am Nothing (5/27/2014)
Popcorn Fish Guinea Pig (4/29/2016)

EPs
I Am The Idiot Of The Jungle (2/2/2010)
U R WHO U LET DIE (12/21/2012) 
Most Likely To Be Conflicted (7/24/2015)

Singles
"Outside" (3/1/2010)
"Egghead" (Appears on the  Pastepunk 12th Anniversary Compilation, 10/12/2010)
"Blood Mountain" (1/11/2012)
"End of Days Reprise" (10/25/19)

References

External links

Indie rock musical groups from North Carolina
Musical groups established in 2009
2009 establishments in North Carolina
Equal Vision Records artists
Tiny Engines artists